Aurora-Con was an anime convention held in Anchorage, Alaska at the William A. Egan Civic and Convention Center. It was the first of such conventions to be held at that venue. The convention had a total run of three years.

History
The convention held a fundraiser on November 19, 2005, at the Northway Mall called Gamers Nostalgia to help raise funds toward holding the first Aurora-Con. The convention ceased operations after 2008 due to an lack of volunteers and other unspecified problems.

Event history

References

Defunct anime conventions